William Carey Taylor (September 30, 1886 in Mayfield, Kentucky – March 18, 1971) was an English Baptist minister and missionary for a longtime in Brazil, and a Professor of Greek New Testament and related subjects in the  Baptist Theological Seminary of Rio de Janeiro.

Life 
While living in Lousville, Kentucky, he belonged to Walnut Street Baptist Church.

He received his B.A. degree from Bethel College and completed his Th.M. and Th.D. at Southwestern Baptist Theological Seminary in Ft. Worth, Texas.

Taylor was a Southern Baptist missionary in Brazil by the Foreign Mission Board of the Southern Baptist Convention for 41 years (1915 to 1956). He worked primarily as an educator in Brazil, serving as President and Dean of the North Brazil Seminary in Recife, Brazil. After leaving the mission field in Brazil, he resided in Louisville, Kentucky.

Taylor died at the age of 84 at his home at the Berkeley Hotel, 664 S. Fourth.

Works 
He was author of 28 books on theology.

References

Sources 
 
 
 
 

1886 births
1971 deaths
Evangelicalism in Brazil
People from Maysville, Kentucky
Southern Baptists
Baptist missionaries in Brazil